Nathan Blee (born 7 September 1990) is a professional Australian rules football player who played for the Port Adelaide Football Club in the Australian Football League (AFL). He was recruited by the club in the 2011 National Draft, with pick #51. Blee made his debut in round 20, 2012, against  at York Park.

References

External links

1990 births
Living people
Port Adelaide Football Club players
Port Adelaide Football Club players (all competitions)
Australian rules footballers from Western Australia
East Perth Football Club players